McAllaster is a ghost town in Logan County, Kansas, United States.

History
McAllaster was platted in 1887.

The McAllaster post office was discontinued in 1953.

One house is all that remains of this former community.

References

Further reading

External links
 Logan County Maps: Current, Historic, KDOT

Unincorporated communities in Logan County, Kansas
Unincorporated communities in Kansas
Populated places established in 1887
1887 establishments in Kansas